is a Japanese composer, arranger, pianist and music producer. She has provided the music for several anime series, television dramas and video games. She is best known for composing the soundtrack for Darling in the Franxx, as well as for co-composing the scores for Seraph of the End and Haikyu!!.

Biography 
Tachibana was born in Kanagawa Prefecture, in 1987. She began playing piano from an early age. Later, she learned other instruments by joining music clubs at school, playing horn in junior high school and double bass in high school. After school, she decided to devote herself to music, studying composition and arrangement diligently.

In 2011, alongside Yutaka Yamada, Tachibana made her debut as a composer in the television series HUNTER - Women After Reward Money. Since then, she has been involved in many soundtrack works, several of which with composer Yuki Hayashi.

Works

Anime

Television dramas

Video games

References

External links 

 
 Discography at VGMdb
 
 

1987 births
21st-century Japanese women musicians
21st-century Japanese composers
21st-century Japanese pianists
Anime composers
Living people
Musicians from Kanagawa Prefecture
Women television composers
21st-century women pianists